The Loquitz is a river in Bavaria and Thuringia, Germany. It flows into the Saale in Kaulsdorf (Saale).

See also
List of rivers of Bavaria
List of rivers of Thuringia

References

Rivers of Bavaria
Rivers of Thuringia
Rivers of Germany